Anouche Kunth is a French historian. She is a specialist in state violence and crimes as well as the Armenian  exile.

Life 
Anouche Kunth studied medieval history and then taught in secondary school. She then made radio documentaries for France Culture, and became interested in contemporary history.

She defended her thesis at the School of Advanced Studies in Social Sciences (EHESS) in 2013, entitled From the Caucasus to Paris: another Armenian exile: migratory experiences and anchoring in the diaspora (from 1920 to the implosion of the Soviet Union ) under the direction of Claire Mouradian. From her thesis, a book was published in 2016 by Belin.

Her research focuses on the dispersion of Ottoman Armenians after the 1915 genocide and the establishment of the Kemalist regime in Turkey. Through microhistory, she seeks to grasp the impact of the genocide on individual lives.

In 2014, she joined the National Center for Scientific Research (CNRS) as a research fellow in the International Migrations, Spaces and Societies laboratory. In 2017, she was a research fellow at the Institute for Interdisciplinary Research on Social Issues.

She is part of the Genocide and Crimes Against Humanity Mission and participates in the drafting of its report published in 2018.

She is a member of several editorial boards, in particular of the journal Sensibilités. Histoire, Critique et Sciences sociales, with Quentin Deluermoz, Thomas Dodman, Hervé Mazurel and Clémentine Vidal-Naquet.

Works 

 
 .
 .

References 

21st-century French historians
French women historians
French medievalists
French military historians
Living people
Date of birth missing (living people)